Industrifacket Metall (IF Metall) is a trade union in Sweden. It was formed in a 2006 merger between the Swedish Industrial Union (Industrifacket) and the Swedish Metalworkers' Union (Metall). Its roots in Metall trace back to 1888.

IF Metall has a membership density of 80%. On formation, it had 337,712 members, but this fell steadily, to 241,951 in 2019.  IF Metall represents workers in around 11,500 workplaces. 21% are women, 15% are under 30 years of age. in a variety of sectors, including:

 mechanical engineering and the plastics industry
 the building material industry
 the mining sector
 the ironworks sector
 the textile industry, including clothing
 automobile repair shops
 disabled workers doing similar tasks within government sponsored projects, including Samhall

IF Metall is the second-largest affiliate of the Swedish Trade Union Confederation. On 4 December 2020, PTK, Kommunal, IF Metall and the Confederation of Swedish Enterprise (SN) signed a new main agreement on changes to employment protection (severance rules, etc.) and expanded opportunities for skills development and retraining.

List of chairmen
 Stefan Löfven, 2006–2012
 Anders Ferbe, 2012–2017
 Marie Nilsson, 2017–present

References

Swedish Trade Union Confederation
General unions
Trade unions in Sweden
2006 establishments in Sweden
Trade unions established in 2006